Ingunn Rise Kirkeby (born 27 May 1961) is a Norwegian handball player. She played 64 matches and scored 49 goals for the Norwegian national team between 1980 and 1983.  She participated at the 1982 World Women's Handball Championship, where the Norwegian team placed seventh.  She currently coaches a girls handball team. She works as a neurosurgeon in Oslo, Norway.

References

Living people
Norwegian female handball players
1961 births
20th-century Norwegian women